Gotstabe a Better Way! is an album by saxophonist James Spaulding which was recorded in 1988 and released on the Muse label.

Reception

The AllMusic review by Michael G. Nastos stated "Veteran saxophonist in his best light".

Track listing
All compositions by James Spaulding except where noted
 "Bold Steps" – 5:39
 "Blue Hue" – 5:14
 "Ginger Flower Song" – 6:10
 "Remember There's Hope" – 5:55
 "Little Niles" (Randy Weston) – 6:32
 "Gotstabe" – 6:28
 "In Flight Out" – 6:40
 "I Have You" – 5:35
 "Barbados" (Charlie Parker) – 6:21

Personnel
James Spaulding – alto saxophone, flute, piccolo
Mulgrew Miller – piano 
Monte Croft – vibraphone (tracks 2-4 & 6-9)
Ron Carter – bass 
Ralph Peterson Jr. – drums
Ray Mantilla – congas, percussion

References

Muse Records albums
James Spaulding albums
1990 albums
Albums recorded at Van Gelder Studio